Aleppo was never a capital of any of the grand Arab dynasties, but nevertheless the city's central position in the Levant between Damascus and Baghdad, and its closeness to Anatolia, helped the city to prosper fast. This is a list of mosques in Aleppo from different dynastic periods.

Rashidunids
Al-Tuteh mosque, (Al-Atras mosque), 637 AD
Al-Nuqtah Mosque

Ummayads

Great Mosque of Aleppo, 716 AD

Mashriq Dynasties
Sheikh Mohsen mosque, Hammdanids, 962 AD
Al-Seeda mosque, Zengid
Al-Tersusi mosque, Zengid, 1146 AD
Al-Saleheen mosque, Zengid, 1105 AD

Ayyubids
Mosque of Al-Madrasah al Sharafeya, 1242 AD
Khanqah Al-Farafira mosque (named after Farafira city in Egypt)
Mosque of Sheikh Ma'rouf Bin Jamr, 1193 AD
Mosque of Meeru (Shanqos mosque), 1220 AD
Mosque of Al-Sheikh Hammoud, 1146 AD
Al-Zaherya complex, 1219 AD
Mosque of Sidna Hamza, 1156 AD
Al-Zawya Al-Hilaleya mosque, 1213 AD
Al-Atabkeya mosque, 1223 AD
Mosque of Abu-Zer, 1198 AD
Mosque of Al-Mustadameya (Ibn Al-Nafees mosque), 1223 AD
Al-Sultaniyah Madrasa, 1223 AD

Mamluks

Al-Sahibiyah mosque
Al-Saffahiyah mosque
Mosque of Sheikh Ali Al-Hindi 
Bawakib mosque 1885 AD
Al-Ebn mosque 16th century
Mosque of Qastel Harami, 1490 AD
Al-Midani mosque, 16th Century
Al-Mar'ashlee mosque, 1246 AD
Nouredin mosque, 1327 AD
Mosque of Al-Zaki, 1300 AD
Sheikh Amr Al-Wafa'e Al-Ba'aj mosque, 1336 AD
Al-Qarnaseya Complex
Al-Mehmendar mosque, 13th century
Mosque of Senekli, 1215 AD
Al-Hariri mosque
Complex of Al-Naseriya, 1323 AD
Al-Bezazi mosque
Al-Mawazeeni mosque, 1394 AD
Al-Rumi mosque, 1366 AD
Mosque of Ebis 
Mosque of Abu Yehya Al-Kawkabi
Mosque of Suleyman Al-Ayyubi
Mosque of Banuqsa, 1386 AD
Mosque of AL-Tun Bogha, 1318 AD
Terenta'eya Complex
Al-Atroush mosque, 1398 AD

Turkic Dynasties
Arslan Dada mosque, Seljuk, 1115 AD
Mosque of Maqdemiya, Seljuk, 1168 AD
Turkmanjek mosque, 1503 AD

Ottomans

Khusruwiyah Mosque, 1544 AD
Al-Adeliyah mosque
Al-Qaiqan mosque
Gheyour Bek mosque 1930 AD
Zaki Pasha mosque 1898 AD
Al-Malkhana mosque (Al-Mawlaweya Tikkeya)
Al-Shaboura mosque (Kheir Allah mosque)
Sa'ad Allah Al-Jabki mosque
Al-Shara'asus Mosque
Qastal Al-Mesht mosque, 1637 AD
Seya Jan mosque, 1577 AD
Al-Kilani mosque
Al-'Aryan mosque, (Al-Sha'rani mosque), 1896 AD
Al-Zawya Al-Aqiliya mosque, 1796 AD
Konbor mosque, 1752 ad.
Al-Fera mosque, (Al-Anjak mosque), 1622 AD
Mosque of Al-Sharaf
Mosque of Seeta, 1471 AD
Al-Fostok mosque, 1363 AD
Haj Mousa mosque
Souk Al-Zahawi mosque, 1803 AD
Ma'lak Al-Sabou mosque, 1524 AD

Modern

Ar-Rahman mosque, 1976 AD
Mosque of Ahmed Bin-Hanbal
Amr Salem Mosque
President's Mosque
Al-Mazra'a mosque (Al-Shah'rour mosque)
Al-Sadeek mosque, 1935
Imam Shafe'i mosque
Amr Bin Abdelaziz mosque
Sa'ad Bin Abu Wuqas
Azbakeya mosque
Sheikh Taha mosque
Dar Essalam mosque
Mosque of El-Sheikh Maksoud
Grand Mosque of Salah Al-Din Al-Ayoubi, 1990
Sheikh Amr Anis mosque, 1972
Estekama mosque, 1991
Mosque of Ahmed Al-Badawi, 1963
Al-Midan Mosque (Shabarek mosque), 1948
Al-Teena mosque
Amri mosque
At-Tawhid Mosque

List|Mosques
Aleppo
Mosques, Aleppo